The 2022–23 Kategoria e Tretë is the 20th official season of the Albanian football fourth division since its establishment. The season began on 24 November 2022 and will end in May 2023. There are 13 teams competing this season, split in 2 groups.

Changes from last season

Team changes

From Kategoria e Tretë
Promoted to Kategoria e Dytë:
 Delvina
 Elbasani
 Valbona

To Kategoria e Tretë
Relegated from Kategoria e Dytë:
 Gramozi
 Këlcyra
 Klosi
 Përmeti

Stadia by capacity and locations

Group A

Group B

League standings

Group A

Results

Group B

Results

Top scorers

References

4
Albania
Kategoria e Tretë seasons